Roberto Bisconti (born 21 July 1973 in Montegnée, Liège) is a Belgian retired footballer who played as a midfielder.

Club career
During his career, Bisconti played for Standard Liège on four occasions (where he earlier played a minor role in a generation of players dubbed The Three Musketeers, composed of Régis Genaux, Michaël Goossens and Philippe Léonard), A.C. Monza Brianza 1912, R. Charleroi SC, Aberdeen, FC Rapid București (six-month contract), OGC Nice, En Avant de Guingamp and Panthrakikos FC (no official games in Greece).

On 16 February 2009 Bisconti returned to Belgium after five years, signing with third division club C.S. Visé on a free transfer, until the end of the season. He retired from football in June 2011, aged 38.

International career
Bisconti earned 13 caps for Belgium, making his full debut at almost 31 in a 0–2 friendly loss with France, on 18 February 2004.

Honours
Standard Liège
 Belgian Cup: 1992–93

References

External links

 Roberto Bisconti Interview

1973 births
Living people
People from Saint-Nicolas, Liège
Belgian people of Italian descent
Belgian footballers
Association football midfielders
Belgian Pro League players
Standard Liège players
R.F.C. Seraing (1904) players
R. Charleroi S.C. players
Serie B players
A.C. Monza players
Scottish Premier League players
Aberdeen F.C. players
Liga I players
FC Rapid București players
Ligue 1 players
Ligue 2 players
OGC Nice players
En Avant Guingamp players
Panthrakikos F.C. players
Belgium under-21 international footballers
Belgium international footballers
Belgian expatriate footballers
Expatriate footballers in Italy
Expatriate footballers in Scotland
Expatriate footballers in Romania
Expatriate footballers in France
Expatriate footballers in Greece
Belgian expatriate sportspeople in France
R.F.C. Tilleur players
Footballers from Liège Province